Joseph Gomer (1834–1892) was an African American missionary on behalf of the United Brethren Church active in Sierra Leone.

Gomer was born in Michigan. During the American Civil War he served in the Union Army. Following the end of the war he settled in Dayton, Ohio. Here he became involved with the United Brethren Church. He  married Mary Wiley, and in 1870 the couple were approved by the church for approved for missionary work in Sierra Leone, where they arrived in 1871. Here they were stationed at Shenge, Sherbro Island. They joined a mission station which had been founded in 1855 and which grew coffee and rubber trees. Gomer introduced improved farming methods. Following a fund-raising tour  of the United States, he established an industrial school.

He remained in Sierra Leone, where he would die of apoplexy.

References

African-American missionaries
1834 births
1892 deaths
American expatriates in Sierra Leone